The All-Ireland Senior B Hurling Championship of 1994 was the 21st staging of Ireland's secondary hurling knock-out competition.  Roscommon won the championship, beating London 1-10 to 1-9 in the final at the Emerald GAA Grounds, Ruislip.

References

 Donegan, Des, The Complete Handbook of Gaelic Games (DBA Publications Limited, 2005).

1994
B